Taiga is a biome characterized by coniferous forests.

Taiga may also refer to:

Arts and entertainment

Fictional characters
, a character from Kamen Rider Ryuki
, a character from Toradora!
, a character from Fate/stay night
, a character from Kamen Rider Ex-Aid
, a character from Kuroko's Basketball
, a character from Assassination Classroom
, a character from Garo
, a character from Yakuza

Film and television 
 Taiga (1958 film), a German film
 Taiga (1992 film), a 1992 documentary 
 Taiga drama, a series of year-long Japanese historical TV dramas
Ultraman Taiga, a 2019 tokusatsu series

Music
 Taiga (OOIOO album), 2006
 Taiga (Zola Jesus album), 2014
 Taiga, musician Bryant Clifford Meyer's solo project

People
, a Japanese painter
, Japanese footballer
, a Japanese actor
, a Japanese footballer
, a Japanese sumo wrestler

Other uses
 Taiga (project management), open source software
 Taiga nuclear test, on the potential route of Pechora–Kama Canal in Russia in 1971
 Taïga, a beer by Belgh Brasse
 Taiga, a leather line by Louis Vuitton
 IZh-94 "Taiga", a Russian combination gun
 Taiga Motors, an electric snowmobile manufacturer based in Montreal, Canada
 Taiga (roller coaster), a ride at the Linnanmäki amusement park in Helsinki, Finland
 TAIGA, an expired trademark for a prepress workflow product by Dainippon Screen

See also

Tiger (disambiguation)
Bentley Bentayga, an SUV named after portmanteau of Bentley and Taiga
Tayga, a town in Kemerovo Oblast, Russia
Taigā Mahōbin Kabushiki Gaisha, or Tiger Corporation
Ulaan Taiga, a mountain range in Mongolia

Japanese masculine given names